Madam Secretary may refer to:

 "Madam Secretary", a term of address in the United States and United Kingdom for female cabinet secretaries presiding over governmental bodies.
 Madam Secretary (book), the 2003 autobiography of United States Secretary of State Madeleine Albright
 Madam Secretary (TV series), a U.S. political drama television series (2014–2019)